The 2015 Ghanaian Premier League (known as the First Capital Plus Bank Premier League for sponsorship reasons) season will be the 56th season of top-tier football in Ghana. The competition was scheduled to begin in late September 2014 or early October 2014, although it did not start until January 2015.

Ashanti Gold broke up Asante Kotoko's run of dominance with their first league title (They had previously won three under the name Goldfields). Asante Kotoko entered the league having won the last three titles and 24 total dating back to 1959. There was little drama concerning the championship as Ashanti Gold held first place for 29 of the 30 rounds this season, only briefly falling to second in Round 4, and clinching the title with a week to go.

There was considerable drama in the race to avoid relegation as eight teams were still in danger of falling into the bottom three on the final day of the season (Brong Ahafo Stars had sealed their fate several weeks earlier). Great Olympics got the win they needed, 2-1 over Ashanti Gold, but didn't get the help they needed to climb out of the bottom three as five other teams ahead of them won or drew. Heart of Lions was the other club to be relegated, falling from ninth to 14th with the season-ending 4-2 loss at New Edubiase. Brong Ahafo Stars, Great Olympics and Heart of Lions will all play in Division One for the 2015-16 season.

Teams and venues

Team movement

Teams promoted following 2013–2014 Glo Premier League season
 Brong Ahafo Stars, (Sunyani, Brong-Ahafo)
 Accra Great Olympics F.C., (Accra, Greater Accra)
 West African Football Academy, (Gomoa Fetteh, Central)
 Runner-up of the 2015 Ghanaian FA Cup qualifies for the 2016 CAF Confederation Cup.
 Winner of runner-up of the 2014–15 Ghanaian FA Cup qualifies for the 2016 CAF Confederation Cup.

Standings

Positions by round

Top scorers

Updated to games played on 13 September 2015 Source: soccerway.com

References

External links
 Season at soccerway.com

Ghana Premier League seasons
Ghanaian Premier League
1
Ghanaian Premier League
1